Illa de la Llum is a complex of two skyscrapers in Barcelona, Catalonia, Spain, completed in 2005. Illa de la Llum 1 has 26 floors and rises 88 meters, and Illa de la Llum 2 has 18 floors and rises 64 meters.

See also 

 List of tallest buildings and structures in Barcelona
Espais Promocions Immobiliaries

References 

Residential skyscrapers in Spain
Skyscrapers in Barcelona
Buildings and structures completed in 2005